Acocella is an Italian surname. Notable people with the surname include:

 Joan Acocella (born 1945), American journalist
 Marisa Acocella Marchetto (born 1962), American author
 Nicola Acocella (born 1939), Italian economist and academic
 Louis Gino Acocella (born 1941), Canadian wrestler, better known by his ring name Gino Brito

References 

Italian-language surnames